Remo Germani, the stage name of Remo Speroni, (31 May 1938 – 18 October 2010) was an Italian singer and occasional actor, mainly successful in the 1960s.

Life and career 
He was born in  Milan. While employed as a bank teller in 1957, Germani started performing as a singer in his spare time. Put under contract by the record company Jolly, in 1962 he got his first success, "Baci". In 1963 he ranked third on the Italian hit parade with the song "Non andare col tamburo".  Between 1964 and 1967 he participated to four editions of the Sanremo Music Festival and appeared in a few Musicarello films. In 1978 he moved to Vigevano, where he founded Radio City Ducale. From the 1980s he was active as the leader of a dance orchestra. In his later years he developed diabetes.

Discography 
Albums
 
     1963 - Baci (Jolly, LPJ 5026)
     1965 - Remo Germani (Jolly, LPJ 5044)
     1990 - Germani 90 (Fonit Cetra, PL 798) 
     1998 - Remo Germani - Baci (Joker, CD 22193)

References

External links 

 Remo Germani at Discogs

 

1937 births
2010 deaths
Singers from Milan
Italian male film actors
Italian pop singers
20th-century Italian  male singers